Homoeosoma anaspila is a species of snout moth in the genus Homoeosoma. It is endemic to New Zealand. It found in the North and South Islands as well as the Kermadec Islands.

Taxonomy 
This species was first described by Edward Meyrick in 1901 using specimens from Waipukurau collected by Meryrick himself in March and two other specimens collected in Christchurch including one collected by R. W. Fereday. That latter specimen is the designated lectotype and is held at the Natural History Museum, London.

Description 
Meyrick described the species as follows:

Distribution 
The species is endemic to New Zealand. It has been collected in the wider Mackenzie basin, and the Canterbury region, as well as on the Kermadec Islands.

Biology and behaviour 
The adults of this moth are on the wing during the months of October to December and also in March.

Habitat and host species 

The larvae feed on Vittandinia species including Vittadinia gracilis and Vittadinia australis as well as Helichrysum luteoalbum, Hieracium lepidulum, Jacobaea vulgaris and Ozothamnus leptophyllus.

References

Moths described in 1901
Phycitini
Taxa named by Edward Meyrick
Endemic fauna of New Zealand
Moths of New Zealand
Endemic moths of New Zealand